Year of the Tiger is a year in the Chinese zodiac.

Film and TV
A Yank in Viet-Nam, originally to be called Year of the Tiger 1963
The Year of the Tiger, 1965 basketball film featuring Bill Bradley
Year of the Tiger, documentary about four Siberian tiger cubs by New York Zoological Society 1980 
The Year of the Tiger, 2011 Chilean drama film

Music
Year of the Tiger (La! Neu? album), 1998
Year of the Tiger (Josh Todd & The Conflict album), 2017
Year of the Tiger (Myles Kennedy album), 2018